Zainuddin Hamidi (March 2, 1952 - July 5, 2011), also colloquially known as Zainuddin M.Z., was an Indonesian Islamic preacher, da'i, and politician. He was nicknamed as Dai Sejuta Umat (da'i for millions) due to his sheer popularity among the Indonesian society. He entered politics later in his career, first serving as an administrator of the United Development Party (PPP), and later the chairman of the Reform Star Party (PBR).

Early life
Zainuddin was the only child born in a Betawi family. His family was considered as a part of nahdliyin, a community under the influence of Nahdlatul Ulama. His talent in speech was already visible since his childhood. He went through secondary education at Darul Ma'arif madrasa in Jakarta. During this time, he took the speech course known as Ta'limul Muhadharah (the study of speech). He pursued his higher education at IAIN Syarif Hidayatullah in Jakarta, and postgraduate education at the National University of Malaysia. His hobby was listening to dangdut music.

Career
Lecture by Zainuddin was often attended by tens of thousands of people, making him nicknamed as Dai Sejuta Umat (da'i for millions). His wife Kholilah was also increasingly known to the public as his lecture began to be recorded. Cassettes containing his lecture were sold not only in all of the archipelago but also in some other neighboring Asian countries. He then was frequently featured in TV programs, and also appeared in a collaborative program with pop actors called Nada and Dakwah.

His talent in preaching had led him to the world of politics. During 1977-1982 he was active in the United Development Party (PPP), a political party espousing the Islamic identity. His participation in PPP was heavily influenced by his background as a part of nahdliyin, and the presence of his mentor, Idham Chalid, the former chairman of Nahdlatul Ulama, who was among the founders of PPP. During this time, he was active as an administrator of the party, and concurrently became a member of the advisory board belongs to PPP Jakarta office. PPP valued the presence of Zainuddin and considered him as the key figure for votes. Together with Rhoma Irama, a dangdut popstar, he toured various regions for the campaign and posed a threat to the New Order regime and the dominance of Golkar.

On January 20, 2002, Zainuddin declared the partition from PPP known as Reformation PPP (PPPR) together with his colleagues, which later renamed to the Reform Star Party (PBR) on April 8–9, 2003. He was officially designated as a presidential candidate endorsed by the party during the 2004 presidential election and served as the chairman of the party until 2006. After the departure, he refocused on dawah and televangelism targeting ordinary people.

Death
On July 5, 2011, Zainuddin suffered the seizure after breakfast with his family at his home in Gandaria I, Kebayoran Baru, South Jakarta. He died on his way to the Pertamina Central Hospital, due to heart attack stemming from hyperglycemia.

Filmography
Nada dan Dakwah (1991)

Awards and nominations

Television Shows 
 Tabligh Akbar Ramadhan (Indosiar, Ramadhan 2000-2001)
 Pengantar Sahur dan Buka Puasa (Indosiar, Ramadhan 1999-2002)
 Dakwah Puasa (SCTV, Ramadhan 1991-2001)

Articles in Magazine and Tabloids
 Majalah Gatra, February 1997 and June 2003
 Majalah Femina Serial Baru

References

1952 births
2011 deaths
Betawi people
Indonesian Muslim missionaries
Indonesian Muslims
People from Jakarta